Intellcorp Group is a Lisbon, Portugal, based international intelligence and security group that works in Portuguese-speaking markets but has clients in many other territories.

History
Intellcorp was founded in 2016. In 2017, the two founders, David G. Santos and Ruben Ribeiro decided to follow different paths and the company suspended its activity, until the end of 2018. In December 2018, IntellCorp initiated a new period, with the original founder Ruben Ribeiro, and current CEO, acquiring other companies and expanding the areas of operation and the project. IntellCorp became IntellCorp Group, headquartered in Queluz, Lisbon. 

Ruben Ribeiro worked as an Intelligence Officer at the Strategic Defense Information Service (SIED) where he worked both in strategic and tactical analysis as well as in the operational area. In 2014, Ribeiro at his request left SIED and transferred to the Presidência do Conselho de Ministros (PCM). Ruben Ribeiro got known, after a Portuguese newspaper wrote an article about IntellCorp  and after a question by a member of Parliament to the Prime Minister , about the legality of IntellCorp and Ruben Ribeiro's participation in the project. The Prime Minister's Office answered that, after careful consideration, all legal issues were satisfied and there was no wrong doing. 

IntellCorp Group is the first Portuguese speaking group of companies , working in global intelligence and security for both the public and the private sector. The companies also work on protecting individuals, companies, organizations and governments from criminal or terrorist threats and elements.

Intellcorp Group not only assists other companies in entering Portuguese speaking or foreign markets by connecting them with decision makers and influences  but also develops political advice activities to politicians and leaders, like supporting the Dhlakama family (Mozambique) in their business and image interests as well as Henriques Afonso Dhlakama, son of the late RENAMO leader, in his announced candidacy  to the next Mozambican Presidential election, in 2024.

The company has hired over 70 employees who are former intelligence officers, diplomats, ex-security forces personnel, ex-special forces and analysts, having received extensive media coverage.   

Intellcorp is a member of AFCEA.

See also
Aperio Intelligence
TARGIT Business Intelligence
Stratfor
Academi

References

External links
Official website

Business intelligence companies
Companies based in Lisbon
Portuguese companies established in 2016